Tomi Leivo (born September 24, 1989) is a Finnish ice hockey player who currently plays professionally in Finland for SaiPa of the SM-liiga.

References

External links

Living people
SaiPa players
1989 births
Finnish ice hockey forwards
People from Lappeenranta
Sportspeople from South Karelia